Delirium tremens (DTs) is a rapid onset of confusion usually caused by withdrawal from alcohol. When it occurs, it is often three days into the withdrawal symptoms and lasts for two to three days. Physical effects may include shaking, shivering, irregular heart rate, and sweating. People may also hallucinate. Occasionally, a very high body temperature or seizures (colloquially known as "rum fits") may result in death. Alcohol is one of the most dangerous drugs to withdraw from.

Delirium tremens typically only occurs in people with a high intake of alcohol for more than a month. A similar syndrome may occur with benzodiazepine and barbiturate withdrawal. Withdrawal from stimulants such as cocaine does not have major medical complications. In a person with delirium tremens it is important to rule out other associated problems such as electrolyte abnormalities, pancreatitis, and alcoholic hepatitis.

Prevention is by treating withdrawal symptoms. If delirium tremens occurs, aggressive treatment improves outcomes. Treatment in a quiet intensive care unit with sufficient light is often recommended. Benzodiazepines are the medication of choice with diazepam, lorazepam, chlordiazepoxide, and oxazepam all commonly used. They should be given until a person is lightly sleeping. The antipsychotic haloperidol may also be used. The vitamin thiamine is recommended. Mortality without treatment is between 15% and 40%. Currently death occurs in about 1% to 4% of cases.

About half of people with alcoholism will develop withdrawal symptoms upon reducing their use. Of these, 3% to 5% develop DTs or have seizures.

The name delirium tremens was first used in 1813; however, the symptoms were well described since the 1700s. The word "delirium" is Latin for "going off the furrow," a plowing metaphor. It is also called the shaking frenzy and Saunders-Sutton syndrome. There are numerous nicknames for the condition, including "the DTs" and "seeing pink elephants" (see below).

Signs and symptoms
The main symptoms of delirium tremens are nightmares, agitation, global confusion, disorientation, visual and auditory hallucinations, tactile hallucinations, fever, high blood pressure, heavy sweating, and other signs of autonomic hyperactivity (fast heart rate and high blood pressure). These symptoms may appear suddenly but typically develop two to three days after the stopping of heavy drinking, being worst on the fourth or fifth day.

These symptoms are characteristically worse at night. In general, DT is considered the most severe manifestation of alcohol withdrawal and occurs 3–10 days following the last drink.

Other common symptoms include intense perceptual disturbance such as visions of insects, snakes, or rats. These may be hallucinations or illusions related to the environment, e.g., patterns on the wallpaper or in the peripheral vision that the patient falsely perceives as a resemblance to the morphology of an insect, and are also associated with tactile hallucinations such as sensations of something crawling on the subject—a phenomenon known as formication. Delirium tremens usually includes extremely intense feelings of "impending doom". Severe anxiety and feelings of imminent death are common DT symptoms.

DT can sometimes be associated with severe, uncontrollable tremors of the extremities and secondary symptoms such as anxiety, panic attacks, and paranoia. Confusion is often noticeable to onlookers as those with DT will have trouble forming simple sentences or making basic logical calculations.

DT should be distinguished from alcoholic hallucinosis, the latter of which occurs in approximately 20% of hospitalized alcoholics and does not carry a risk of significant mortality. In contrast, DT occurs in 5–10% of alcoholics and carries up to 15% mortality with treatment and up to 35% mortality without treatment.

Causes
Delirium tremens is mainly caused by a long period of drinking being stopped abruptly. Withdrawal leads to a biochemical regulation cascade.

Delirium tremens commonly affects those with a history of habitual alcohol use or alcoholism that has existed for more than 10 years.

Pathophysiology

Delirium tremens is a component of alcohol withdrawal hypothesized to be the result of compensatory changes in response to chronic heavy alcohol use. Alcohol positively allosterically modulates the binding of GABA, enhancing its effect and resulting in inhibition of neurons projecting into the nucleus accumbens, as well as inhibiting NMDA receptors.  This combined with desensitization of alpha-2 adrenergic receptors, results in a homeostatic upregulation of these systems in chronic alcohol use.

When alcohol use ceases, the unregulated mechanisms result in hyperexcitability of neurons as natural GABAergic systems are down-regulated and excitatory glutamatergic systems are unregulated.  This combined with increased noradrenergic activity results in the symptoms of delirium tremens.

Diagnosis
Diagnosis is mainly based on symptoms. In a person with delirium tremens it is important to rule out other associated problems such as electrolyte abnormalities, pancreatitis, and alcoholic hepatitis.

Treatment
Delirium tremens due to alcohol withdrawal can be treated with benzodiazepines. High doses may be necessary to prevent death. Amounts given are based on the symptoms. Typically the person is kept sedated with benzodiazepines, such as diazepam, lorazepam, chlordiazepoxide, or oxazepam.

In some cases antipsychotics, such as haloperidol may also be used. Older drugs such as paraldehyde and clomethiazole were formerly the traditional treatment but have now largely been superseded by the benzodiazepines.

Acamprosate is occasionally used in addition to other treatments, and is then carried on into long-term use to reduce the risk of relapse. If status epilepticus occurs it is treated in the usual way.

It can also be helpful to provide a well lit room as people often have hallucinations.

Alcoholic beverages can also be prescribed as a treatment for delirium tremens, but this practice is not universally supported.

High doses of thiamine often by the intravenous route is also recommended.

Society and culture

Nicknames for delirium tremens include "the DTs", "the shakes", "the oopizootics", "barrel-fever", "the blue horrors", "bottleache", "bats", "the drunken horrors", "seeing pink elephants", "gallon distemper", "quart mania", "heebie jeebies", "pink spiders", and "riding the ghost train", as well as "ork orks", "the zoots", "the 750 itch", and "pint paralysis".  Another nickname is "the Brooklyn Boys",  found in Eugene O'Neill's one-act play Hughie set in Times Square in the 1920s. Delirium tremens was also given an alternate medical definition since at least the 1840s, being known as mania a potu, which translates to 'mania from drink'.

English author George Eliot provides a case involving delirium tremens in her novel Middlemarch (187172). Alcoholic scoundrel John Raffles, both an abusive stepfather of Joshua Riggs and blackmailing nemesis of financier Nicholas Bulstrode, dies, whose "death was due to delirium tremens" while at Peter Featherstone's Stone Court property. Housekeeper Mrs. Abel provides Raffles' final night of care per Bulstrode's instruction whose directions given to Abel stand adverse to Dr. Tertius Lydgate's orders.

French writer Émile Zola's novel The Drinking Den (L'Assommoir) includes a character – Coupeau, the main character Gervaise's husband – who has delirium tremens by the end of the book.

American writer Mark Twain describes an episode of delirium tremens in his book The Adventures of Huckleberry Finn (1884). In chapter 6, Huck states about his father, "After supper pap took the jug, and said he had enough whisky there for two drunks and one delirium tremens. That was always his word." Subsequently, Pap Finn runs around with hallucinations of snakes and chases Huck around their cabin with a knife in an attempt to kill him, thinking Huck is the "Angel of Death".

One of the characters in Joseph Conrad's novel Lord Jim experiences "DTs of the worst kind" with symptoms that include seeing millions of pink frogs.

English author M. R. James mentions delirium tremens in his 1904 ghost story 'Oh, Whistle, and I'll Come to You, My Lad'. Professor Parkins while staying at the Globe Inn when in coastal Burnstow to "improve his game" of golf, despite being "a convinced disbeliever in what is called the 'supernatural, when face to face with an entity in his "double-bed room" during the story's climax, is heard "uttering cry upon cry at the utmost pitch of his voice" though later "was somehow cleared of the ready suspicion of delirium tremens".

In the 1945 film The Lost Weekend, Ray Milland won the Academy Award for Best Actor for his depiction of a character who experiences delirium tremens after being hospitalized, hallucinating that he saw a bat fly in and eat a mouse poking through a wall.<ref>Cameron, Kate. ‘The Lost Weekend’ effectively portrays the damage caused by alcoholism on screen 'The Lost Weekend effectively portrays the damage caused by alcoholism on screen"] , New York Daily News, January 2, 1945, reprinted February 17, 2015. Accessed February 15, 2017. "If you read the book, which was a best-seller last year, you know that Jackson did a remarkable job of recording the actions of Birnam, during a weekend binge of monumental proportions, and in setting down in graphic prose the effects produced on him by liquor. In adapting the book to the screen, Brackett and Wilder have accomplished an equally remarkable feat of projecting a case of delirium tremens on screen."</ref>

Writer Jack Kerouac details his experiences with delirium tremens in his book Big Sur.

The M*A*S*H TV series episode "Bottoms Up" (season 9, episode 15) featured a side story about a nurse (Cpt. Helen Whitfield) who was found to be drinking heavily off-duty. By the culmination of the episode, after a confrontation by Maj. Margaret Houlihan, the character swears off alcohol and presumably quits immediately. At mealtime, roughly 48 hours later, Whitfield becomes hysterical upon being served food in the Mess tent, claiming that things are crawling onto her from it. Margaret and Col. Sherman Potter subdue her. Potter, having recognized the symptoms of delirium tremens orders 5 ml of paraldehyde from a witnessing nurse.

During the filming of the 1975 film Monty Python and the Holy Grail, Graham Chapman developed delirium tremens due to the lack of alcohol on the set. It was particularly bad during the filming of the bridge of death scene where Chapman was visibly shaking, sweating and could not cross the bridge. His fellow Pythons were astonished as Chapman was an accomplished mountaineer. 

Irish singer-songwriter Christy Moore has a song on his 1985 album, Ordinary Man, called "Delirium Tremens" which is a satirical song, directed towards the leaders in Irish politics and culture. Some of the people mentioned in the song include former Fianna Fáil leader Charles Haughey, at the time a Labour TD, later the party leader Ruairi Quinn, former Labour Party leader Dick Spring and Roger Casement, who was captured bringing German guns to Ireland for the 1916 Easter Rising.

The Belgian beer "Delirium Tremens," introduced in 1988, is a direct reference and also uses a pink elephant as its logo to highlight one of the symptoms of delirium tremens.

In the 1995 film Leaving Las Vegas'', Nicolas Cage plays a suicidal alcoholic who rids himself of all his possessions and travels to Las Vegas to drink himself to death. During his travels, he experiences delirium tremens on a couch after waking up from a binge and crawls in pain to the refrigerator for more vodka. Cage's performance as Ben Sanderson in the film won the Academy Award for Best Actor in 1996.

Russian composer Modest Mussorgsky (1839-1881) died of delirium tremens.

See also

 Alcohol dementia
 Alcohol detoxification
 Delusional parasitosis
 Excited delirium
 On the wagon

References

External links 

 Why Does Alcohol Cause the Shakes? | Alcohol Withdrawal Syndrome Tremors | Dr Peter MCcann MCC, MBBS | Castle Craig Hospital

Health effects of alcohol
Addiction psychiatry
Intensive care medicine
Neurological disorders
Latin medical words and phrases
Medical emergencies
Alcohol abuse
Wikipedia medicine articles ready to translate
Wikipedia emergency medicine articles ready to translate